Algeria competed at the 2019 World Athletics Championships in Doha, Qatar, from 27 September to 6 October 2019. Six athletes represented Algeria at the event.

Results

Men
Track and road events

Field events

Nations at the 2019 World Athletics Championships
World Championships in Athletics
Algeria at the World Championships in Athletics